Attorney General Brady may refer to:

M. Jane Brady (born 1951), Attorney General of Delaware
Maziere Brady (1796–1871), Attorney General of Ireland
Rory Brady (1957–2010), Attorney General of Ireland

See also
General Brady (disambiguation)